The 1998 AFL Grand Final was an Australian rules football game contested between the  Adelaide Crows and the North Melbourne Kangaroos, held at the Melbourne Cricket Ground in Melbourne on 26 September 1998. It was the 102nd annual grand final of the Australian Football League (formerly the Victorian Football League), staged to determine the premiers for the 1998 AFL season. The match, attended by 94,431 spectators, was won by Adelaide by a margin of 35 points.

Background

This match saw the Kangaroos playing in their second grand final in three years, after their triumph in the 1996 AFL Grand Final. The Crows were competing in their second consecutive grand final, and were seeking back-to-back premierships after winning the 1997 AFL Grand Final. Craig Sholl for the Kangaroos was to play his 200th game.

At the conclusion of the home and away season, North Melbourne had finished first on the AFL ladder with 16 wins and 6 losses, winning the McClelland Trophy. They had won their last nine matches. Adelaide had finished fifth with 13 wins and 9 losses.

Adelaide fell to a heavy loss in its qualifying final against Melbourne at the MCG by 48 points, but still progressed to play a semi-final against Sydney at the SCG, which they won by 27 points. Adelaide then progressed to the preliminary final against the Western Bulldogs at the MCG, and won convincingly by 68 points.

North Melbourne won its qualifying final against Essendon by 22 points at the MCG, sending them to a home preliminary final against Melbourne.  They won that match by 30 points to progress to the grand final. The finals wins extended North Melbourne's winning streak to eleven matches entering the grand final. The Kangaroos entered the game as heavy favourites.

Match summary

North Melbourne attacked constantly during the first half, however returned a wasteful 6.15 (51) for the first half to Adelaide's 4.3 (27). They led by just four goals despite having 21 scoring shots to just seven in the first half.

Adelaide then dominated the second half. A wasteful 5.8 to North Melbourne's 2.0 in the third quarter saw the Adelaide leading by two points at three-quarter time. Then, Adelaide scored 6.4 in the final quarter, holding North Melbourne (0.7) goalless, to open a comfortable lead, and ultimately win the match by 35 points.

Adelaide became the first team since Hawthorn in 1988-1989 to win back-to-back premierships. In the end, both teams had 30 scoring shots, but the Crows converted at 50% and the Kangaroos at just 26%.

Darren Jarman was sensational with 5 goals and Andrew McLeod was awarded the Norm Smith Medal for being judged the best player afield, for the second straight year. He became only the second player (after Gary Ayres of Hawthorn) to win the medal twice, and the first player to win it in successive years.

Adelaide is one of just two clubs in modern times to have won the premiership after finishing lower than fourth on the premiership ladder after the home-and-away season (Melbourne won the premiership after finishing sixth after the fourteen-game home-and-away season in 1900, qualifying for the semi-finals after a strong performance in the three-week sectional round robin that followed the home-and-away season; the Western Bulldogs won the premiership after finishing seventh in the home-and-away season in 2016).

Pre-match entertainment
The 1998 Grand Final pre-match entertainment was particularly notable for the appearance of former World Heavyweight Boxing champion Muhammad Ali, as he did a lap of honour of the ground. Rob Guest performed This Is The Moment as the champion made his way around the ground.  Guest later sang the national anthem.

Donna Fisk and Michael Cristiano performed "Rock 'N Footy (Rock The G)".

The song performed at every grand final, Waltzing Matilda, was performed by Jane Scali and Michael Cormick.

Teams

Match details

See also 
1998 AFL season
1998 AFL Finals Series

References

VFL/AFL Grand Finals
Adelaide Football Club
North Melbourne Football Club
1998 Australian Football League season
Afl Grand Final, 1998